Kotte is a German surname. Notable people of the surname include the following:
 Anton Kotte (1818–1892), Dutch author
 Arne Kotte (1935–2015), Norwegian football player
 Gido Oude Kotte (1980), Dutch politician
 Guuske Kotte (died 1590), Dutch actress
 Karen Kotte (died 1590), Danish businesswoman
 Karolina Kotte, Swedish badminton player
 Lars Kotte (1956), Swedish badminton player
 Peter Kotte (1954), German footballer
 Roland Kotte, German researcher
 Walter Kotte (1893–1970), German botanist
 Werner Kotte (1931), former German rear admiral
 Winand Kotte (1922–2006), Dutch priest

German-language surnames
Surnames of German origin
Surnames of Dutch origin
Surnames of Danish origin
Surnames of Swedish origin
Surnames of Norwegian origin